The 204th Street station was a local station on the demolished IRT Third Avenue Line in the Bronx, New York City. It had three tracks and two side platforms. The next stop to the north was 210th Street–Williamsbridge. The next stop to the south was 200th Street. The station opened on October 4, 1920, and closed on April 29, 1973.

References

External links 

Railway stations in the United States opened in 1920
Railway stations closed in 1973
1920 establishments in New York City
1973 disestablishments in New York (state)
IRT Third Avenue Line stations
Former elevated and subway stations in the Bronx
Norwood, Bronx